First Baptist Church is a historic church at 241 Hargadine Street in Ashland, Oregon.

It was built in 1911 and added to the National Register in 1979.

Ashland's First Baptist Church was sold in the late 1960s. Over the next fifteen years and multiple owners the building remained vacant and deteriorated through vandalism. It was, at one point, painted bright pink, creating a landmark known locally as "the Old Pink Church." In 1982 the boarded-up building was purchased by Craig Hudson to create the Oregon Cabaret Theatre, restoring the structure to its 1911 appearance, including replication of many of the stained glass windows.

References

Baptist churches in Oregon
Churches on the National Register of Historic Places in Oregon
Mission Revival architecture in Oregon
Churches completed in 1911
National Register of Historic Places in Jackson County, Oregon
Buildings and structures in Ashland, Oregon
1911 establishments in Oregon
Historic district contributing properties in Oregon
Ashland Downtown Historic District